Public Telephone is a 1980 French documentary film directed by Jean-Marie Périer. It was screened out of competition at the 1980 Cannes Film Festival.

Cast
 Jean-Louis Aubert
 Louis Bertignac
 Félix Bussy
 Dominique Forestier
 Richard Kolinka
 Jean-Yves Lovaille
 Corine Marienneau
 François Ravard

References

External links

1980 films
1980s French-language films
French documentary films
Films directed by Jean-Marie Périer
1980 documentary films
1980s French films